The Hereford Times is a weekly tabloid newspaper published every Thursday in Hereford, England. Its offices are based in Holmer Road. The editor is John Wilson. The newspaper covers events across the county of Herefordshire as well as some on the outskirts of Worcestershire.

The newspaper was founded as a broadsheet in 1832 by Charles Anthony and until recently was published in two separate editions, the North County edition and the City & South edition.

The newspaper is owned by Newsquest Media Group.

References

External links
Hereford Times

Publications established in 1832
Newspapers published in Herefordshire
Hereford
Newspapers published by Newsquest
Weekly newspapers published in the United Kingdom
1832 establishments in England